Isochaetina is a genus of parasitic flies in the family Tachinidae.

Species
Isochaetina dimorpha (Mesnil, 1950)

Distribution
This genus is known from India.

References

Exoristinae
Diptera of Asia
Monotypic Brachycera genera
Insects of India
Tachinidae genera